

Zamfir Munteanu was a Bessarabian politician.

He served as Member of the Moldovan Parliament (1917–1918).

Gallery

Bibliography 
Gheorghe E. Cojocaru, Sfatul Țării: itinerar, Civitas, Chişinău, 1998, 
Mihai Taşcă, Sfatul Țării şi actualele authorităţi locale, "Timpul de dimineaţă", no. 114 (849), June 27, 2008 (page 16)
Alexandru Chiriac. Membrii Sfatului Ţării. 1917–1918. Dicţionar, Editura Fundaţiei Culturale Române, București, 2001.

Notes

External links 
 Biblio Polis – Vol. 25 (2008) Nr. 1 (Serie nouă)
 Arhiva pentru Sfatul Tarii
 Deputaţii Sfatului Ţării şi Lavrenti Beria

Moldovan MPs 1917–1918
People from Bessarabia Governorate
Year of death missing
Year of birth missing